Serena Williams successfully defended her title, beating Sara Errani in the final, 6–3, 6–0.

Seeds
The top eight seeds receive a bye into the second round.

 Serena Williams (champion)
 Li Na (quarterfinals)
 Agnieszka Radwańska (quarterfinals)
 Simona Halep (third round, withdrew because of an abdominal injury)
 Petra Kvitová (second round)
 Jelena Janković (semifinals)
 Angelique Kerber (second round)
 Maria Sharapova (third round)
 Dominika Cibulková (first round)
 Sara Errani (final)
 Ana Ivanovic (semifinals)
 Flavia Pennetta (third round)
 Carla Suárez Navarro (quarterfinals)
 Caroline Wozniacki (withdrew because of a knee injury)
 Sabine Lisicki (first round)
 Sloane Stephens (second round)
 Eugenie Bouchard (first round)

Click on the seed number of a player to go to their draw section.

Draw

Finals

Top half

Section 1

Section 2

Bottom half

Section 3

Section 4

Qualifying

Seeds

  María Teresa Torró Flor (first round)
  Jana Čepelová (first round)
  Casey Dellacqua (qualified)
  Christina McHale (qualified)
  Marina Erakovic (first round)
  Polona Hercog (first round)
  Zheng Jie (first round)
  Monica Puig (qualified)
  Vania King (first round)
  Lauren Davis (qualified)
  Paula Ormaechea (qualifying competition, lucky loser)
  Stefanie Vögele (qualifying competition)
  Urszula Radwańska (qualifying competition)
  Virginie Razzano (qualifying competition, retired)
  Ajla Tomljanović (qualifying competition)
  Monica Niculescu (qualifying competition)

Qualifiers

  Mona Barthel
  Petra Cetkovská
  Casey Dellacqua
  Christina McHale
  Lauren Davis
  Belinda Bencic
  Chanelle Scheepers
  Monica Puig

Lucky loser
  Paula Ormaechea

First qualifier

Second qualifier

Third qualifier

Fourth qualifier

Fifth qualifier

Sixth qualifier

Seventh qualifier

Eighth qualifier

External links
 Main draw
 Qualifying draw

2014 WTA Tour
Women's Singles